Pulau Ketam ("Crab Island") is an island located off the coast of Port Klang, Selangor, Malaysia. The island is in the intertidal zone and the chief vegetation is mangrove.

Background

The island is home to two predominantly Chinese fishing villages founded circa 1880. The main village on the southern side of the island is also known as Pulau Ketam. The other village on the northeastern side is called Sungai Lima ("Fifth River"), its location being at the fifth inlet from the main village. The locals are mainly Teochew and Hokkien Chinese, with Teochew, Hokkien and Mandarin Chinese the main dialects spoken. There is also a small recently relocated Orang Asli community at the second inlet. The rest of the island consists of mangrove swamps. 

The main thoroughfares are narrow concreted pavements, whilst in the residential areas, the older rickety wooden plank bridges can still be seen. There are no cars on the island; bicycles, some of which are motorised, are the main means of transportation within the villages. There are no pavements linking the villages, the only means of transportation between villages is by boat. Daily ferry services link the island to Port Klang jetty on the mainland.

The main economic activity on the island is fishing. The island is also a tourist spot.

In popular culture
Pulau Ketam is featured as the main filming location for 2015 Malaysian movie, Paint My Love.

External links

References

Islands of Selangor
Klang District
Nature sites of Selangor